David Frederick Joy (born 23 September 1943) is a former professional footballer who played for Huddersfield Town and York City.

References

1943 births
Living people
English footballers
People from Barnard Castle
Footballers from County Durham
Association football defenders
Spennymoor Town F.C. players
Huddersfield Town A.F.C. players
York City F.C. players
English Football League players